Sutton Park railway station was a railway station in Sutton Coldfield, Warwickshire, (in Birmingham since 1974), England, on the Midland Railway's Sutton Park Line. The station opened in 1879, and closed to passengers in 1965. The line remains open for freight trains.

References

Disused railway stations in Birmingham, West Midlands
Railway stations in Great Britain opened in 1879
Railway stations in Great Britain closed in 1965
1879 establishments in England
1965 disestablishments in England
Beeching closures in England
Former Midland Railway stations